Divinylbenzene (DVB) is an organic compound with the chemical formula  and structure  (a benzene ring with two vinyl groups as substituents). It is related to styrene (vinylbenzene) by the addition of a second vinyl group.   It is a colorless liquid manufactured by the thermal dehydrogenation of isomeric diethylbenzenes.  Under synthesis conditions, o-divinylbenzene converts to naphthalene and thus is not a component of the usual mixtures of DVB.

Production and use
It is produced by dehydrogenation of diethylbenzene:
 C6H4(C2H5)2   →   C6H4(C2H3)2  +  2 H2
Divinylbenzene is usually encountered as a 2:1 mixture of m- and p-divinylbenzene, containing also the corresponding isomers of ethylvinylbenzene.

Styrene and divinylbenzene react to form the copolymer styrene-divinylbenzene, S-DVB or Sty-DVB. The resulting cross-linked polymer is mainly used for the production of ion exchange resin and Merrifield resins for peptide synthesis.

Nomenclature
 Ortho: variously known as 1,2-diethenylbenzene, 1,2-divinylbenzene, o-vinylstyrene, o-divinylbenzene
 Meta: known as 1,3-diethenylbenzene, 1,3-divinylbenzene, m-vinylstyrene, m-divinylbenzene
 Para: known as 1,4-diethenylbenzene, 1,4-divinylbenzene, p-vinylstyrene, p-divinylbenzene. 
These compounds are systematically called diethenylbenzene, although this nomenclature is rarely encountered.

References

Vinylbenzenes
Monomers
C4-Benzenes